Khaki-ye Olya (also Romanized as Khākī-ye ‘Olyā; also known as Khākī) is a village in Chahar Gonbad Rural District, in the Central District of Sirjan County, Kerman Province, Iran. At the 2006 census, its population was 21, in 7 families.

References 

Populated places in Sirjan County